The Estonian Weather Service is the Estonian national meteorological service.

Estonian Weather Service is a department part of the Estonian Environment Agency, which in turn is under the responsibility of the Ministry of the Environment.

Estonian Weather Service is a member of the World Meteorological Organization (WMO) and European Organisation for the Exploitation of Meteorological Satellites (EUMETSAT).

Before 1 June 2013, the department was a separate agency on its own known as the Estonian Meteorological and Hydrological Institute (EMHI).

Estonian Weather Service's webpage offers you 4day forecast (also in Russian and English), week forecast and month forecast (only in Estonian). Page also has a radar, model forecast and warnings.

References

External links

Governmental meteorological agencies in Europe
Organizations based in Estonia
Research institutes in Estonia